Saalmuellerana is a genus of moths of the family Noctuidae The genus was erected by David Stephen Fletcher and Pierre Viette in 1962. It was later described by David Stephen Fletcher and Pierre Viette in 1962.

Species
 Saalmuellerana glebosa (Saalmüller, 1891)
 Saalmuellerana illota Viette, 1973
 Saalmuellerana media (Walker, 1857)
 Saalmuellerana rufimixta (Hampson, 1918)
 Saalmuellerana schoenheiti (Strand, 1912)

References

Hadeninae